Sajid Ali (born 23 January 1979) is a Pakistani cricketer. He played in 34 first-class and 18 List A matches between 1997 and 2006. He made his Twenty20 debut on 25 April 2005, for Lahore Lions in the 2004–05 National Twenty20 Cup.

References

External links
 

1979 births
Living people
Pakistani cricketers
Lahore cricketers
Lahore Lions cricketers
Khan Research Laboratories cricketers